The UK Advisory Committee on Degree Awarding Powers (ACDAP), is a committee within the Quality Assurance Agency for Higher Education. It is responsible for considering applications for degree awarding powers and university title (DAP/UT), and providing confidential advice via the Board to the Privy Council. All applications for new universities must be approved by the Committee.

Purpose
ACDAP is responsible for considering applications for degree awarding powers and university title (DAP/UT). No organisation may award degrees or call itself a university in the UK unless authorised to do so by the government via the committee. There are three levels of DAP - Foundation, Teaching, and Research DAPs. It also oversees the criteria and scrutiny processes used to assess applications.

Membership
The Committee's membership comprises the independent Chair, two Board members, seven members with current or recent UK DAP experience, two members with experience within a professional body, one member with a background in College Higher Education and one student member. Two more members may added to the Committee to bring other relevant expertise.

References

Higher education organisations based in the United Kingdom